Burn My Eyes is the debut studio album by American heavy metal band Machine Head, released on August 9, 1994, by Roadrunner Records. The album's themes generally tie into the social disorder and corresponding inner tension that the band was exposed to in their native Oakland, California, reflected in Robb Flynn's lyrics, such as the Los Angeles Riots of 1992 and the Waco Siege of 1993. The album's title alludes to the third part of the phrase, "Burn my eyes and try to blind me" during the breakdown of "Old". The album shipped over 400,000 copies worldwide, becoming Roadrunner Records's best selling debut album until the release of Slipknot's self-titled debut album. This is Machine Head's only studio album to feature drummer Chris Kontos.

Album information 
The songs make references to some certain well-publicized controversies such as the 1992 Los Angeles Riots (heard in dialogue on "Real Eyes, Realize, Real Lies") and the Waco Siege of 1993 ("Davidian"). Elsewhere, there are tales of physical and mental abuse ("None But My Own", "The Rage to Overcome"), the condemning of profits from religious soliciting ("Death Church"), succumbing to substance abuse ("I'm Your God Now"), and aforementioned themes of urban decay, social unrest, rebellion, belligerence, or socio-political commentary.

Stylistically, the album is credited as having bridged the gap between "second-generation Bay Area thrash (Testament, Death Angel, etc.) and the modern-day Pantera school of hard knocks." Compared to their later releases, it's rawer and more aggressive; after changing their sound on their three subsequent albums, the style was resurrected in modified form—the influences of Gothenburg were evident—on their post-Supercharger output.

The release of this album was followed shortly by numerous tours, which eventually led to drummer Chris Kontos leaving the band and being replaced, after careful consideration, by Dave McClain, who would stay with the band until 2018. Kontos, along with guitarist Logan Mader, would return to Machine Head in 2019 to celebrate the 25th anniversary of Burn My Eyess release with a tour, though neither of them officially rejoined the band.

The album has since become a lasting success. In 1994, it quickly became a Roadrunner Records best seller and was the label's best-selling debut album for a number of years, until the release of  Slipknot's 1999 self-titled debut.

Cancelled re-release 
On October 31, 2006, Roadrunner Records announced that as part of their 25th anniversary, they would be re-releasing Burn My Eyes with a bonus CD, which includes previously unreleased tracks and rarities. It was said to be due out on January 8, 2007, but was then pushed back to September 2007 so it would not interfere with the release of The Blackening. However, the re-release was in fact cancelled. Robb Flynn explained this on his blog, which is posted on Machinehead1.com:

Reception 

 Q magazine (11/94, p. 115) – 4 Stars – Excellent – "...a violent, grinding experience, spiked with social comment and spruced up with some brain- tingling guitar..."
 Kerrang! (p. 21) – "Burn My Eyes took the heaviness and speed of thrash and combined it with the sledgehammer grooves of more left-field acts."
 Kerrang! (p. 53) – "[O]ne of the most ferocious and groove-laden behemoths the metal world has, and likely will ever see."

Track listing

Australian tour edition 
The following songs constitute the entirety of the Burn My Eyes Demo.

Personnel 

Machine Head
Robb Flynn – lead vocals, rhythm guitar
Logan Mader – lead guitar
Adam Duce – bass, backing vocals
Chris Kontos – drums

Artwork
Dave McKean – cover illustration and design
Jesse Fischer – band photo
Harald O. & Wasco – live photos
Robb Flynn – Machine Head logo

Production
Colin Richardson – production, mixing
Machine Head – co-production
Vincent Wojno – engineering, recording, mixing at Scream Studios
Steven Werner, Liz Sroka  – assistant engineering
Eddy Schreyer – mastering at Future Disc, California

Managerial
Monte Conner – A&R
Joseph W. Huston – management
Jeffery Saltzman – legal representation
Jonathan Wexler – accounting

Chart performance

Certifications

References 

1994 debut albums
Albums with cover art by Dave McKean
Machine Head (band) albums
Roadrunner Records albums